Jennifer Christina Finnigan (born August 22, 1979) is a Canadian actress, best known for her role as Bridget Forrester in the American soap opera The Bold and the Beautiful from 2000 to 2004, for which she won three Daytime Emmy Awards for Outstanding Younger Actress in a Drama Series. She also appeared on the CBS legal drama Close to Home (2005–2007) and the ABC sitcom Better with You (2010–2011). Finnigan also starred on the FX series Tyrant (2014–2016). She later starred in the CBS sci-fi drama Salvation (2017–2018).

Early life and education
Finnigan was born in Montreal, Quebec. She is the daughter of Diane Rioux Finnigan, and popular radio personality Jack Finnigan, who was a fixture on CJAD radio in Montreal from 1972 to 2005. She attended The Sacred Heart School of Montreal, a Catholic, all-girl private school from which she graduated in 1996.

Personal life
Finnigan married actor Jonathan Silverman on June 7, 2007, on the island of Mykonos in Greece. She and Silverman have a daughter, Ella Jack, born on September 29, 2017.

Career

1998–2000
From 1998 to 2000, Finnigan appeared in a variety of Canadian shows. In 1998, she made a few guest appearances on "The Mystery Files of Shelby Woo". In early 1999, she appeared in one episode of "Big Wolf on Campus" and throughout the end of 1999, she starred in a sitcom called  Student Bodies playing the role of Kim McCloud in the show's final season. Throughout the first half of 2000, she played the character "Tara" in the episode "The Tale of the Last Dance" in Season 7 of Are You Afraid of the Dark?, as well as making a guest appearance on La Femme Nikita.

2000–2004
In mid-2000, Finnigan moved to the United States and got the role of Bridget Forrester in the long-running soap opera The Bold and the Beautiful in July 2000. In December 2000, she also starred in a true story in the telefilm The Stalking of Laurie Show about the real life murder of a young teenage girl. Finnigan starred as Bridget on The Bold and the Beautiful from July 2000 until January 2004 and won three awards for her work on the show. She is the first person to win three consecutive Daytime Emmy Awards (29th, 30th, 31st Awards), all as "Outstanding Younger Actress". She left the show in January 2004 to pursue other acting roles.

2004–2005
From March 2004 until November 2004, Finnigan was featured on 10 episodes of Crossing Jordan as pathologist Dr. Devan Maguire. Following her departure from the show, she played the character Marni Fliss on the NBC series Committed, which only aired for 13 episodes before being cancelled due to low ratings. The show aired from January until March 2005. In mid-2005, she made a guest appearance as Alex Sinclair in The Dead Zone episode "Double Vision".

2005–2007
Starting in the fall of 2005, Finnigan was the star of the CBS television drama series Close to Home, playing a deputy district attorney. In December 2005, while still starring in Close to Home, she made a second guest appearance as Alex Sinclair in the episode "A Very Dead Zone Christmas," on The Dead Zone. Close to Home aired for two seasons before it was cancelled in May 2007. In August 2007, Finnigan made one final guest appearance on The Dead Zone in the episode "Exile", just before the show ended in late 2007.

2008–present
Finnigan co-starred with her husband, actor Jonathan Silverman, in Beethoven's Big Break, the latest installment in the Beethoven film series; the film was released direct-to-DVD in late 2008. She also starred in Playing for Keeps, a CTV/Lifetime Original Movie, broadcast as What Color is Love? in the United States.  Finnigan starred in the ABC sitcom Better with You, which was cancelled after only one season.

She co-starred alongside Jason Priestley in the Psych sixth-season episode, "Neil Simon's Lover's Retreat". She has also done Shadow Island Mysteries: The Last Christmas and Shadow Island Mysteries: Wedding for One.

In 2013, she starred on the TNT series Monday Mornings on which her real life husband Jonathan Silverman was a recurring cast member. The series was canceled after one season.

She also starred on the FX series Tyrant, which began on June 24, 2014. Tyrant aired its final episode on September 7, 2016, after three seasons.

She appeared as Grace Barrows, the Pentagon's press secretary, on the CBS action drama Salvation. Barrows was one of a few people initially informed when the Pentagon learned Earth will collide with an asteroid with potential extinction-level destruction capacity. The series ran for two seasons.

Filmography

Film

Television

Awards and nominations

References

External links

1979 births
Actresses from Montreal
Anglophone Quebec people
Canadian soap opera actresses
Canadian television actresses
Living people
Daytime Emmy Award winners
Daytime Emmy Award for Outstanding Younger Actress in a Drama Series winners
21st-century Canadian actresses